2009 Kataller Toyama season

Competitions

Player statistics

Other pages
 J. League official site

Kataller Toyama
Kataller Toyama seasons